Camille Bombois (3 February 1883 – 6 June 1970) was a French naïve painter especially noted for paintings of circus scenes.

Bombois was born in Venarey-les-Laumes in the Côte-d'Or, in humble circumstances. His childhood was spent living on a barge and attending a local school until the age of twelve, when he became a farm worker. During his free time he drew and competed in wrestling competitions at local fairs. He became a champion local wrestler before joining a traveling circus as a strongman and wrestler.

In 1907, Bombois fulfilled his dream of moving to Paris, where he married and worked as a railway laborer, eventually finding a night job at a newspaper printing plant handling heavy newsprint rolls. Despite the exhausting nature of his job he painted from dawn to dusk, sleeping little. He showed his paintings in sidewalk exhibitions, but his earliest paintings, revealing the influence of the old masters in their subdued use of color, attracted few buyers.

1914 marked the beginning of four-and-a-half years of military service in World War I. Bombois spent much of it on the front line, earning three decorations for bravery. Upon his return home, encouraged that his wife had succeeded in selling a number of his paintings in his absence, he resumed his routine of night labor and daytime painting. In 1922, his sidewalk displays in Montmartre began attracting the attention of collectors. The art dealer Wilhelm Uhde "discovered" him in 1924, and exhibited Bombois' work in the Galeries des Quatre Chemins in 1927. In 1937, his works were shown in the exhibition "Maîtres populaires de la réalité" in Paris. His first solo show was in 1944 at the Galerie Pétridès. Critics compared Bombois' work to that of Henri Rousseau, which it  resembled in its naïve drawing, crisp delineation of form, and attention to detail, although Bombois was less of a fantasist than Rousseau.

The paintings of his maturity are bold in color, featuring strong contrasts of black, bright reds, blues and electric pinks. Drawing from his own experiences, he often painted circus performers and landscapes with fishermen. His paintings of women are emphatic in their carnality, and his landscapes are notable in their careful attention to space, and to the effects of reflected light on water. Bombois' works are on view in many public collections, notably the Musée Maillol in Paris.

Notes

References
 
 Pouillon, Nadine. "Bombois, Camille." Grove Art Online. Oxford Art Online. Oxford University Press. Web.

External links
WWAR
MOMA

1883 births
1970 deaths
French male painters
20th-century French painters
Naïve painters
French military personnel of World War I
20th-century French male artists